La Marzocco, founded in 1927, Florence, by Giuseppe and Bruno Bambi, is an Italian company specializing in high-end espresso coffee machines. It is based in Scarperia,  with branch offices worldwide.

History
After the Bambi brothers manufactured their first coffee machine Fiorenza on commission, they established their own activity in 1927 specialized in hand-crafting espresso machines, and named it after the Marzocco – the city of Florence's symbol of victory and conquest and whose image and values were chosen to represent the company brand.

As coffee consumption increased in Italy throughout the 20th century, La Marzocco over the decades introduced technological innovations, improved ergonomics and barista tools, establishing industry standards.

In 1939, La Marzocco patented the first espresso machine with a horizontal boiler, which, in comparison to the previous vertical structure, organized the brew groups in a horizontal fashion, which provided efficiency for the barista and an opportunity to engage with customers.

Following the introduction of the lever machines in 1947, La Marzocco began to manufacture its own models, keeping in mind design that would refer to the context of the environment and time.

In the early 1950s, Piero Bambi, who is currently Honorary President, joined the business of his father Giuseppe and his uncle.

From 1964 to 1970 La Marzocco produced the Poker series, in which the piston, unlike lever machines, was lifted and pressed during brewing by means of a diaphragm, that was inflated by steam pressure generated by the boiler.

In 1968, Giuseppe Bambi's "Vulcano" grinder was awarded the Decorative and Industrial Arts Prize at the 14th Triennale di Milano exhibition.

In 1970, La Marzocco patented its first series of professional semi-automatic, dual-boiler machines named "GS" (GS for Gruppo Saturo, or saturated group), winning the Qualità e Cortesia-Toscana prize in 1971.   The two independent boilers separated coffee extraction from steam production thus, together with the saturated groups, ensured thermal stability and improved coffee quality in the cup since water now flowed through independent circuits.

From the seventies onward all machine boilers are manufactured in stainless steel. In 1982, the GS/2 - a redesigned GS model - won the Premio Andino de Fomento prize, and in 1988 the American firm ESF (future Espresso Specialists, Inc.) run by Kent Bakke became the exclusive supplier of La Marzocco machines for Starbucks until the latter, after 16 years, transitioned to super-automatic machines.  Kent Bakke began importing La Marzocco machines to the United States in 1978.

In 1990, Piero Bambi designed his first machine in its entirety, the "Linea Classic", which proved to be very technician-friendly.  In 1994, La Marzocco International, LLC., a formal partnership between the Bambi family and a team of American coffee enthusiasts and Italian partners, led by Kent Bakke, is established.

In 1997, the FB/70 coffee machine (FB for Fratelli Bambi) is launched to celebrate La Marzocco's 70th anniversary and in 2000 the "Swift" grinder is awarded Best New Product at the San Francisco SCAA conference, being the first patented model to combine dosing, grinding and automatic tamping technologies.

In 2001, La Marzocco began the first of 8 years as sponsor of the World Barista Championship in its endeavor to boost the barista profession and engage with end customers as specialty coffee communities developed worldwide.

In 2005, the GB/5 machine (named after Piero's wife, Giovanna Bambi) is introduced, equipped with a CPU board and improved thermo-stability in light of the introduction of "PID" technology.

The FB/80 was manufactured for the 2006 World Barista Championship in Bern to mark the company's 80th anniversary, whereas the GS/3 model is presented in 2007. That year, La Marzocco also launched the "Songwa Estate Project", a non-profit joint venture aiming to provide educational experiences for members of the specialty coffee industry and convey increased awareness of the bean-to-cup cycle through local, charitable support and commitment.

In April 2009, the company presented its pressure profile technology at SCAA on a prototype, which, for the first time, enabled the barista to have direct pressure control at any point during extraction. Soon after, its branch in the USA is established, the Italian factory is relocated to nearby Scarperia, with a showroom and training center, and La Marzocco's first "Out of The Box" event is inaugurated in Milan. The redesigned Vulcano grinder, with Mazzer grinder technology, is introduced on this occasion, and the pressure profile technology introduced earlier in the year is built into the newly designed Strada EP (electronical paddle). The Strada MP (mechanical paddle) is on display as well. The Strada EE (semi-automatic) is introduced in January 2014.

In 2013, the Linea PB, named after the machine's designer Piero Bambi model is introduced at the Boston SCAA conference. The Linea PB refashions the Linea Classic and is distinguished by a new proprietary software platform which controls brewing time and volume. The Vulcano Swift grinder is introduced as well and incorporates the Swift technology with the design of the Vulcano.

The Strada EE (semi-automatic) is introduced in January 2014.

The Strada AV prototype is introduced in 2015 and launched in 2016.

In 2015, the company launches the Linea Mini for the home. Born from the commercial espresso machine, the Linea Classic, the Linea Mini is equipped with a dual boiler, a pre-programmed pre-infusion feature and is optimized for the home in light of a built-in water reservoir, standard appliance power needs and its countertop footprint. The Linea Mini was awarded Best New Product and the People's Choice awards at SCAA (Seattle) in April 2015.

Use
La Marzocco Linea machines were used at almost all Starbucks locations for many years.

From 2000 to 2008, La Marzocco was the official sponsor and supplier of espresso machines for the "World Barista Championship".

Products

Espresso machines

Commercial espresso machines
FB80
GB5
KB90
Leva
Linea Classic
Linea PB
Strada
All commercial machines are available in 2, 3 except the Linea Classic (also 1 and 4); the Linea PB, the GB5 and FB80 (also 4); the Strada EP (also available in 1 group).

Home espresso machines
GS3
Linea Mini
Linea Micra

Coffee grinders
Vulcano
Swift
Lux D

Historical models

Fiorenza 
Marus 
Eureka
National
Mondial
Rondine
Aurum
Alba
Olimpia
Crema-espress
Etruria
Comet
Poker
GS
GS/2
SMALL
FB/70
Mistral

See also 

 Bialetti
 Cimbali
 De'Longhi
 Elektra (espresso machines)
 Faema
 FrancisFrancis
 Gaggia
 Rancilio
 Saeco
 List of Italian companies

References

External links

 La Marzocco Company Homepage, accessed 26 February 2013

Coffee appliance vendors
Espresso machines
Coffee in Italy
Manufacturing companies established in 1927
Home appliance brands
Home appliance manufacturers of Italy
Companies based in Tuscany
Italian companies established in 1927
Italian brands